Notes of Love (also known as The Word Love Exists and Love Notes) is a 1998 Italian-French  romance film directed by Mimmo Calopresti. For her performance Valeria Bruni Tedeschi won the David di Donatello Award for best actress. The film also won the Nastro d'Argento for best script and the Ciak d'oro for best supporting actress (to Marina Confalone).

Cast 
Valeria Bruni Tedeschi: Angela
Fabrizio Bentivoglio: Marco
Gérard Depardieu: Lawyer Levi
Mimmo Calopresti: Analyst
Valeria Milillo: Giovanna
Marina Confalone: Sara
Daria Nicolodi: Mother of Angela
Massimo Bonetti: Bruno

References

External links

1998 films
Italian romantic drama films
1998 romantic drama films
Films directed by Mimmo Calopresti
1990s Italian films